The 1934–35 season was FC Barcelona's 36th in existence. It covers the period from August 1, 1934 to July 31, 1935.

After two years without winning a title, FC Barcelona won the Catalan League for the 19th time.

First-team squad

Transfers

In

Out

 (to Valencia)

 (to Valencia)

Competitions

La Liga

League table

Results by round

Matches

Copa del Rey

Round of 16

Quarterfinals

Catalan football championship

League table

Matches

Results

References

BDFutbol
Webdelcule.com

FC Barcelona seasons
Barcelona